Sesbania tomentosa, commonly known as Oahu riverhemp and ōhai, is an endangered species of plant in the pea family, Fabaceae, that is endemic to the main Hawaiian Islands as well as Nihoa and Necker Island. Associated native plant species include akiaki (Sporobolus virginicus), ilima (Sida fallax), naupaka kahakai (Scaevola taccada), and pili (Heteropogon contortus). Off-road vehicles, wildfires, grazing, and alien species competition have destroyed their habitat on the main islands, but they are still quite common on Nihoa and Necker. At least 2000 specimens grow on Nihoa, while there are far less on Necker.

Ōhai is highly polymorphic, exhibiting broad variations in color and shape. Plants that grow on Nihoa have reddish-orange flowers and young leaflets that are relatively hairless. Necker plants have salmon to orange colored-flowers, and leaflets that are very hairy. A form that grows as a standing tree exists on Molokai.  
Ōhai grows as a prostrate shrub with semi-glaucous hairless leaves on the southernmost tip of the island of Hawaii, Ka Lae.

References

External links

Faboideae
Plants described in 1838
Endemic flora of Hawaii